Davide penitente, K. 469 (also Davidde penitente), is a cantata by Wolfgang Amadeus Mozart, to texts by . The cantata was commissioned by the Wiener Tonkünstler-Societät, and first performed on 13 March 1785 in the Vienna Burgtheater. Most of the music is derived from the unfinished Great Mass in C minor, K. 427 (1782–83), although two arias ("A te, fra tanti affanni" and "Fra l'oscure ombre funeste") and a cadenza for the last movement ("Chi in Dio sol spera") were newly composed for the work.

It has a duration of approximately 45 minutes.

Authorship of text 

The theme of the work is based on the Psalms and the First Book of Samuel of the Old Testament. The text was previously attributed to Lorenzo Da Ponte, following a report by Vincent Novello.

Structure
 Alzai le flebili voci al Signor (Andante moderato: Chorus)
 Cantiamo le glorie e le lodi (Allegro vivace: Chorus)
 Aria: Lungi le cure ingrate (Allegro aperto: Soprano II)
 Sii pur sempre benigno (Adagio: Chorus)
 Duet: Sorgi, o Signore, e spargi i tuoi nemici (Allegro moderato: Sopranos I and II)
 Aria: A te, fra tanti affanni – Udisti i voti miei (Andante – Allegro: Tenor)
 Se vuoi, puniscimi (Largo: Double choir)
 Aria: Fra l'oscure ombre funeste – Alme belle (Andante – Allegro: Soprano)
 Terzetto: Tutte le mie speranze (Allegro: Sopranos I and II, Tenor)
 Chi in Dio sol spera (Adagio: Chorus) – Di tal pericoli non ho timor (Chorus)

Recordings
 1990 – Krisztina Laki, Nicole Fallien, Hans Peter Blochwitz – Nederlands Kamerkoor, La Petite Bande, Sigiswald Kuijken – CD Deutsche Harmonia Mundi

References

External links 
 
 Sample of the text in the original Mattei print
 Digitised Text zur Passions-Musik "Ein Lämmlein geht und trägt die Schuld etc." von C. H. Graun, und zur Cantate Davidde penitente (Der büßende David) von W. A. Mozart. Berlin: Hayn, 1840.
 

Compositions by Wolfgang Amadeus Mozart
1785 compositions
Cantatas